Capraia  may refer to:

 Capraia, an Italian island, the northwesternmost of the seven islands of the Tuscan Archipelago
 Capraia Isola, municipality in the Province of Livorno in the Italian region of Tuscany 
 Capraia e Limite, municipality in the Metropolitan City of Florence in the Italian region Tuscany

See also 

 Capra (disambiguation)